Leslie Hendrix is an American actress. She is best known for playing the role of medical examiner Elizabeth Rodgers on four Law & Order series (Law & Order, Law & Order: Special Victims Unit, Law & Order: Criminal Intent and Law & Order: Trial by Jury). She also played Judge Hannah Lampert on the soap opera All My Children. In the third season of Gotham she plays Kathryn Monroe, the mysterious leader of the Court of Owls.

Filmography

Film

Television

References

External links

Year of birth missing (living people)
20th-century American actresses
21st-century American actresses
American soap opera actresses
American television actresses
American film actresses
Actresses from San Francisco
Living people